Grosses Coques is the name of a village in Digby County, Nova Scotia. It is so named for the big clams found there.

General Service Areas in Nova Scotia
Communities in Digby County, Nova Scotia